Vieux-Rouen-sur-Bresle (literally Old Rouen on Bresle) is a French commune in the Seine-Maritime department in the Normandy region in northern France.

Geography

Description 

Vieux-Rouen-sur-Bresle is a Norman village in the Bresle valley located in Seine-Maritime and bordering the Somme department , which is part of the old Talou , and is marked by the presence of the glassware created in 1892.

It is crossed by the railway line from Épinay-Villetaneuse to Le Tréport-Mers, but the nearest station is the Aumale station. It is served by the RD 49, which connects Aumale to Tréport by the left bank of the Bresle.

The south and west of the town are wooded.

Hydrography 

The river Bresle and its tributary Méline pass through Vieux-Rouen.

Population

Places of interest
 The church of St. Jean-Baptiste, dating from the twelfth century.
 The church of Notre-Dame, dating from the twelfth century.
 The twelfth-century donjon of the castle of Mateputenam.
 The chateau, dating from the sixteenth century.

See also
Communes of the Seine-Maritime department

References

Communes of Seine-Maritime